Made in Romania is the first film directed by producer Guy J. Louthan. It is a comedy film featuring Jennifer Tilly, Jason Flemyng, and Elizabeth Hurley as themselves in a mockumentary about an American/British film crew in Romania making a movie based on a Victorian novel.

External links 
 
 

2010 comedy films
2010 films
British comedy films
American comedy films
2010s English-language films
2010s American films
2010s British films